Maolin (茂林) may refer to the following locations in China:

 Maolin, Jing County, Anhui, town in Jing County, Anhui
 Maolin, Yulin, Guangxi, town in Yulin, Guangxi
 , town in Shuangliao, Jilin
 Maolin, Yongshan County, town in Yongshan County, Yunnan

See also
 Maolin District (茂林區), a rural district in Taiwan